Muodin huipulle (Finnish, "To the Top of Fashion") is Finland's version of the American reality television series Project Runway. The show aired on Finland's MTV3. The show was canceled after its second season.

Overview

The show began airing on October 2009 at 20.00. In addition, Muodin huipulle Extra started airing on MTV3's daughter channel Sub on 24 September at 21.00. Season one was hosted by fashion designer and entrepreneur Minna Cheung in Heidi Klum's role and fashion editor and host Jaakko Selin filled Tim Gunn's role as fashion mentor. Season two's host will be model Nora Vilva and mentor will be designer Janne Renvall. Janne Kataja, who is well known for working on MTV3 and subprograms, hosted Muodin huipulle Extra.

The  season one winner, Katri Niskanen, received a one-year contract with Spalt PR, one year cooperation with L'Oreal Paris hair and makeup, and a Bernina Sewing Machine worth €6,000. In addition to this, the winner's collection was featured in the February 2010 issue of Finnish fashion magazine Olivia.

Seasons

References

External links 
 MTV3 homepage (in Finnish)
 Muodin huipulle homepage

 
2009 Finnish television series debuts
2011 Finnish television series endings
2000s Finnish television series
2010s Finnish television series
Finnish reality television series
MTV3 original programming
Finnish television series based on American television series

fi:Muodin huipulle